Galilee is a large region overlapping with much of the North District of Israel, that is traditionally divided into three regions. It also refers to a body of water.

 The Upper Galilee
 The Lower Galilee
 The Western Galilee
 Sea of Galilee

Galilee or Galilea may also refer to:

Places

Australia 
 Galilee, Queensland, a locality in the Barcaldine Region
 Galilee Basin, a large coal resource in Queensland, Australia

United States 
 Galilee, New Jersey, an unincorporated community in the United States
 Galilee, Pennsylvania, an unincorporated community in the United States
 Galilee, Rhode Island, an unincorporated community in the United States.

Elsewhere
 Galilea, La Rioja, Spain 
 Galilee, Saskatchewan, an unincorporated community in Canada
 697 Galilea, a minor planet
 Galilea Airport, Puerto Galilea, Peru

Ships
 Galilee (ship), an American brigantine built in 1891
 USS Galilea, a U.S. Navy vehicle landing ship built during World War II

Other uses
 Galilee (church architecture), the vestibule in a number of medieval Western monasteries
 Galilee (horse), an Australian racehorse
 Galilee (novel), a novel by Clive Barker
 Galilea Games, a video game developer; see Jack the Ripper
 Galilee of the Nations, a record label

See also
 Galilean (disambiguation)
 Galiléia, a municipality in Minas Gerais, Brazil